A private intelligence agency (PIA) is a private sector (non-governmental) or quasi-non-government organization devoted to the collection, analysis, and exploitation of information, through the evaluation of public sources (OSINT or Open Source INTelligence) and cooperation with other institutions. Some private intelligence agencies obtain information deceptively or through on-the-ground activities for clients.

Private agencies have made their services available to governments as well as individual consumers; they have also sold their services to large corporations with an interest or investment in the category (e.g. crime, disease, corruption, etc.) or the region (e.g. Middle East, Vietnam, Prague, etc.) or to investigate perceived threats such as environmental groups or human rights groups.

Some private intelligence agencies use online perception management, social media influencing/manipulation campaigns, strategic disinformation (such as fake news production/propaganda production), opposition research and political campaigns using social media and artificial intelligence such as Psy-Group, Cambridge Analytica and Black Cube. The Atlantic Council's Digital Forensic Research Lab described the activity of Archimedes Group as practicing "information warfare". Former anti-corruption prosecutor Aaron Sayne said private intelligence is "an industry that's largely undocumented and has very flexible ethical norms" as agencies collect and use sensitive information "for one purpose on day one and some completely contradictory purpose on day two".

The private intelligence industry has boomed due to shifts in how the U.S. government is conducting espionage in the War on Terror. Some $56 billion (USD) or 70% of the $80 billion national intelligence budget of the United States was in 2013 earmarked for the private sector according to The New York Times Tim Shorrock. Functions previously performed by the Central Intelligence Agency (CIA), National Security Agency (NSA), and other intelligence agencies are now outsourced to private intelligence corporations.

List of private intelligence companies

Active
AEGIS (UK)
AggregateIQ (Canada)
Archimedes Group (Israel)
Black Cube (Israel & UK)
Booz Allen Hamilton (US)
Control Risks Group (UK)
Emerdata Limited (UK)
Fusion GPS (US)
Groupe GEOS (France)
Hakluyt & Company (UK) 
Kroll Inc. (US)
NSO Group (Israel)
Oxford Analytica (UK)
Pinkerton National Detective Agency (US)
Smith Brandon International, Inc. (US)
Stratfor (US)

Inactive
Cambridge Analytica (UK)
Psy-Group (Israel)
SCL Group (UK)

See also

Private military company
Private security company
Private investigator
Defense contractor
Business intelligence
Competitive intelligence
Open-source intelligence
Think tank
Labor spying in the United States

References

 
Intelligence agencies